This is a list of schools in the Borough of Swindon in the English county of Wiltshire.

State-funded schools

Primary schools

 Abbey Farm Educate Together Primary, Blunsdon St Andrew
 Abbey Meads Community Primary School, Abbey Meads
 Badbury Park Primary School, Coate
 Beechcroft Infant School, Upper Stratton
 Bishopstone CE Primary School, Bishopstone
 Bridlewood Primary School, Blunsdon St Andrew
 Brook Field Primary School, Shaw
 Catherine Wayte Primary School, Abbey Meads
 Chiseldon Primary School, Chiseldon
 Colebrook Infant Academy, Stratton St Margaret
 Colebrook Junior School, Stratton St Margaret
 Covingham Park Primary School, Covingham
 The Croft Primary School, Old Town South
 Drove Primary School, New Town
 East Wichel Primary School, Wichelstowe
 Eastrop Infant School, Eastrop
 Eldene Primary School, Eldene
 Even Swindon Primary School, Even Swindon
 Ferndale Primary School, Rodbourne
 Goddard Park Community Primary School, Park North
 Gorse Hill Primary School, Gorse Hill
 Grange Infants' School, Stratton St Margaret
 Grange Junior School, Stratton St Margaret
 Greenmeadow Primary School, Greenmeadow
 Haydon Wick Primary School, Haydon Wick
 Haydonleigh Primary School, Haydon Wick
 Hazelwood Academy, Toothill
 Holy Cross RC Primary School, Walcot
 Holy Family RC Primary School, Park North
 Holy Rood RC Primary School
 King William Street CE Primary School
 Kingfisher CE Academy, Wichelstowe
 Lainesmead Primary School. Walcot West
 Lawn Primary School, Lawn
 Lethbridge Primary School, Old Town
 Liden Academy, Liden
 Millbrook Primary School, Freshbrook
 Moredon Primary School, Moredon
 Mountford Manor Primary School, Walcot
 Nythe Primary School, Nythe
 Oakhurst Community Primary School, Oakhurst
 Oaktree Primary School, Park South
 Oliver Tomkins CE Infant School, Toothill
 Oliver Tomkins CE Junior School, Toothill
 Orchid Vale Primary School, Haydon End
 Peatmoor Community Primary School, Peatmoor
 Red Oaks Primary School, Redhouse
 Robert Le Kyng Primary School, Kingshill
 Rodbourne Cheney Primary School, Rodbourne Cheney
 Ruskin Junior School, Upper Stratton
 St Catherine's RC Primary School, Upper Stratton
 St Francis CE Primary School, Taw Hill
 St Leonard's CE Primary Academy, Blunsdon
 St Mary's RC Primary School, Rodbourne
 Seven Fields Primary School, Penhill
 Shaw Ridge Primary School, Shaw
 South Marston CE Primary School, South Marston
 Southfield Junior School, Highworth
 Swindon Academy, Pinehurst
 Tadpole Farm CE Primary Academy, Tadpole Garden Village
 Tregoze Primary School, Grange Park
 Wanborough Primary School, Wanborough
 Westlea Primary School, Westlea
 Westrop Primary School, Westrop
 William Morris Primary School,  Tadpole Garden Village
 Wroughton Infant School, Wroughton
 Wroughton Junior School, Wroughton

Secondary schools

 Abbey Park School, Redhouse
 Commonweal School, Old Town
 The Deanery CE Academy, Wichelstowe
 The Dorcan Academy, Covingham
 Great Western Academy, Tadpole Garden Village
 Highworth Warneford School, Highworth
 Kingsdown School, Stratton St Margaret
 Lawn Manor Academy, Walcot West
 Lydiard Park Academy, Grange Park
 Nova Hreod Academy, Moredon
 The Ridgeway School and Sixth Form College, Wroughton
 St Joseph's Catholic College, Walcot
 Swindon Academy, Pinehurst
 UTC Swindon, Railway Village

Special and alternative schools

 Brimble Hill Special School, Redhouse
 The Chalet School, Liden
 Churchward School, Priory Vale
 Crowdys Hill School, Kembrey Park
 EOTAS Swindon, Ferndale
 Nyland School, Nythe
 St Luke's Academy, Upper Stratton
 Uplands School, Redhouse

Further education
 New College, Walcot
 Swindon College, North Star

Independent schools

Senior and all-through schools
 Maranatha Christian School, Sevenhampton

Swindon
 
Schools
Schools in Swindon